Tomás Argento (born 24 September 1986 in Buenos Aires) is a field hockey striker from Argentina, who made his debut for the national squad in 2005, after having played the Junior World Cup in Rotterdam, The Netherlands. He finished in tenth position with his national team at the 2006 Men's Hockey World Cup in Mönchengladbach. Tomás won two medals at the Pan American Games, two at the Champions Challenge and one at the Champions Trophy.

References
 Argentine Hockey Federation
 Olympic profile

1986 births
Argentine sportspeople of Italian descent
Living people
Argentine male field hockey players
Male field hockey forwards
2006 Men's Hockey World Cup players
Field hockey players at the 2007 Pan American Games
2010 Men's Hockey World Cup players
Field hockey players from Buenos Aires
Pan American Games gold medalists for Argentina
Pan American Games silver medalists for Argentina
Pan American Games medalists in field hockey
South American Games gold medalists for Argentina
South American Games medalists in field hockey
Competitors at the 2006 South American Games
Medalists at the 2007 Pan American Games